En attendant les hommes ("Waiting for Men") is a 2007 documentary film by Katy Léna N'diaye about women muralists in Oualata, Mauritania. In this town on the far edge of the Sahara desert, three women practice traditional painting, and decorate the walls of the town. In a society apparently dominated by tradition, religion and men, these women unreservedly express themselves and comment freely on the relationship between men and women.

Plot 
Oualata, the red city in the far east of the Mauritanian desert. In this islet, an ephemeral rampart against the sands, three women practice traditional painting by decorating the walls of the town's houses. In a society apparently dominated by tradition, religion and men, these women express themselves with surprising freedom in their way of perceiving the relationship between men and women.

References

External links 
 Excerpt from the film on Vimeo.com
 

2007 films
2007 documentary films
African art
Arabic-language films
Belgian documentary films
Documentary films about painters
Documentary films about women in Africa
Films by Serer directors
Films set in Mauritania
2000s French-language films
Mauritanian documentary films
Senegalese documentary films
Women and the arts